William Curzon (c. 1681–1749), of the Inner Temple, was a British lawyer and Tory politician who sat in the House of Commons from 1734 to 1741.

Curzon was the fourth son of Sir Nathaniel Curzon, 2nd Baronet of Kedleston Hall  and his wife, Sarah Penn, daughter of William Penn of Penn, Buckinghamshire. He matriculated at Christ Church, Oxford on 25 June 1696, aged 15. He was admitted at Inner Temple and was  called to the bar in 1705. In 1735, he became a bencher of his Inn.

At the 1734 British general election, Curzon was returned as a Tory Member of Parliament for Clitheroe by his brother, Sir Nathaniel Curzon, 4th Baronet. He was returned again at the 1741 British general election  but was not put up in 1747.  There is no record of his having voted in Parliament.

Curzon died unmarried on 24 June 1749, leaving a large fortune to his brother, Sir Nathaniel.

References

1680s births
1749 deaths
Members of the Parliament of Great Britain for English constituencies
British MPs 1734–1741
British MPs 1741–1747